Klützer Winkel is an Amt in the district of Nordwestmecklenburg, in Mecklenburg-Vorpommern, Germany. The seat of the Amt is in Klütz.

The Amt Klützer Winkel consists of the following municipalities:
Boltenhagen
Damshagen 
Hohenkirchen 
Kalkhorst 
Klütz
Zierow

References

Ämter in Mecklenburg-Western Pomerania